The 1964 United States presidential election in Delaware took place on November 3, 1964, as part of the 1964 United States presidential election. State voters chose three representatives, or electors, to the Electoral College, who voted for president and vice president.

All three counties went blue, and Delaware was won by incumbent President Lyndon B. Johnson (D–Texas), with 60.95% of the popular vote, against Senator Barry Goldwater (R–Arizona), with 38.78% of the popular vote.

Results

See also
 United States presidential elections in Delaware

References

Delaware
1964
1964 Delaware elections